The Coming Race is a novel by Edward Bulwer-Lytton, published anonymously in 1871. It has also been published as Vril, the Power of the Coming Race.
 
Some readers have believed the account of a superior subterranean master race and the energy-form called "Vril", at least in part; some theosophists, notably Helena Blavatsky, William Scott-Elliot, and Rudolf Steiner, accepted the book as based on occult truth, in part. One 1960 book, The Morning of the Magicians by Jacques Bergier and Louis Pauwels, suggested that a secret Vril Society existed in Weimar Berlin.

History
The original, British edition of The Coming Race was published anonymously in May 1871, by Blackwood and Sons of Edinburgh and London. (Blackwood published four more "editions" in 1871.) Anonymous American and Canadian editions were published in August, as The Coming Race, or The New Utopia, by Francis B. Felt & Co. in New York and by Copp, Clark & Co. in Toronto. Late in 1871 Bulwer-Lytton was known to be the author. Erewhon, which was also published anonymously in March 1872, was initially assumed to be a Coming Race sequel by Bulwer-Lytton. When it was revealed that Samuel Butler was the writer in the 25 May 1872 issue of the Athenaeum; sales dropped by 90 percent.

Plot summary

The novel centres on a young, independent, unnamed, wealthy traveller (the narrator), who visits a friend,  a mining engineer. They explore a natural chasm in a mine which has been exposed by an exploratory shaft. The narrator reaches the bottom of the chasm safely, but the rope breaks and his friend is killed. The narrator finds his way into a subterranean world occupied by beings who seem to resemble angels. He befriends the first being he meets, who guides him around a city that is reminiscent of ancient Egyptian architecture. The explorer meets his host's wife, two sons and daughter who learn to speak English by way of a makeshift dictionary during which the narrator unconsciously teaches them the language. His guide comes towards him, and he and his daughter, Zee, explain who they are and how they function.

The hero discovers that these beings, who call themselves Vril-ya, have great telepathic and other parapsychological abilities, such as being able to transmit information, get rid of pain, and put others to sleep. The narrator is offended by the idea that the Vril-ya are better adapted to learn about him than he is to learn about them. Nevertheless, the guide (who turns out to be a magistrate) and his son Ta behave kindly towards him.

The narrator soon discovers that the Vril-ya are descendants of an antediluvian civilization called the Ana, who live in networks of caverns linked by tunnels. Originally surface dwellers, they fled underground thousands of years ago to escape a massive flood and gained greater power by facing and dominating the harsh conditions of the Earth. The place where the narrator descended houses 12,000 families, one of the largest groups. Their society is a technologically-supported Utopia, chief among their tools being an "all-permeating fluid" called "Vril", a latent source of energy that the spiritually elevated hosts are able to master through training of their will, to a degree that depends on their hereditary constitution. This mastery gives them access to an extraordinary force that can be controlled at will. It is this fluid that the Vril-ya employ to communicate with the narrator. The powers of the Vril include the ability to heal, change, and destroy beings and things; the destructive powers in particular are immense, allowing a few young Vril-ya children to destroy entire cities if necessary.

Men (called An, pronounced "Arn") and women (called Gy, pronounced "Gee") have equal rights. The women are stronger and larger than the men. The women are also the pursuing party in romantic relationships. They marry for just three years, after which the men choose whether to remain married, or be single. The female may then pursue a new husband. However, they seldom make the choice to remarry.

Their religion posits the existence of a superior being but does not dwell on his nature. The Vril-ya believe in the permanence of life, which according to them is not destroyed but merely changes form.

The narrator adopts the attire of his hosts and begins also to adopt their customs. Zee falls in love with him and tells her father, who orders Taë to kill him with his staff. Eventually both Taë and Zee conspire against such a command, and Zee leads the narrator through the same chasm which he first descended. Returning to the surface, he warns that in time the Vril-ya will run out of habitable space underground and will claim the surface of the Earth, destroying mankind in the process, if necessary.

Vril in the novel

The uses of Vril in the novel amongst the Vril-ya vary from destruction to healing. According to Zee, the daughter of the narrator's host, Vril can be changed into the mightiest agency over all types of matter, both animate and inanimate. It can destroy like lightning or replenish life, heal, or cure. It is used to rend ways through solid matter. Its light is said to be steadier, softer and healthier than that from any flammable material. It can also be used as a power source for animating mechanisms. Vril can be harnessed by use of the Vril staff or mental concentration.

A Vril staff is an object in the shape of a wand or a staff which is used as a channel for Vril. The narrator describes it as hollow with "stops", "keys", or "springs" in which Vril can be altered, modified, or directed to either destroy or heal. The staff is about the size of a walking stick but can be lengthened or shortened according to the user's preferences. The appearance and function of the Vril staff differs according to gender, age, etc. Some staves are more potent for destruction; others, for healing. The staves of children are said to be much simpler than those of sages; in those of wives and mothers, the destructive part is removed while the healing aspects are emphasised.

Literary significance and reception

The book was quite popular in the late 19th century, and for a time the word "Vril" came to be associated with "life-giving elixirs". The best known use of "Vril" in this context is in the name of Bovril (a blend word of Bovine and Vril). There was even a Vril-ya Bazaar held at the Royal Albert Hall in London in March 1891.

It also had a strong influence on other contemporary authors. When H. G. Wells' novella The Time Machine was published in 1895, The Guardian wrote in its review: "The influence of the author of The Coming Race is still powerful, and no year passes without the appearance of stories which describe the manners and customs of peoples in imaginary worlds, sometimes in the stars above, sometimes in the heart of unknown continents in Australia or at the Pole, and sometimes below the waters under the earth. The latest effort in this class of fiction is The Time Machine, by HG Wells."

Recent research has shown that Bulwer-Lytton developed his ideas about "Vril" against the background of his long preoccupation with occult natural forces, which were widely discussed at that time, especially in relation to animal magnetism or, later, spiritualism. In his earlier novels Zanoni (1842) and A Strange Story (1862), Bulwer-Lytton had discussed electricity and other "material agents" as the possible natural causes for occult phenomena. In The Coming Race, those ideas are continued in the context of a satirical critique of contemporary philosophical, scientific, and political currents. In a letter to his friend John Forster, Bulwer-Lytton explained his motives:

Bulwer-Lytton has been regarded as an "initiate" or "adept" by esotericists, especially because of his Rosicrucian novel Zanoni (1842). However, there is no historical evidence that suggests that Bulwer-Lytton can be seen as an occultist, or that he has been the member of any kind of esoteric association. Instead, it has been shown that Bulwer-Lytton has been "esotericized" since the 1870s. In 1870, the Societas Rosicruciana in Anglia appointed Bulwer-Lytton as its "Grand Patron." Although Bulwer-Lytton complained about this by letter in 1872, the claim has never been revoked. Other claims, such as his membership in a German masonic lodge Zur aufgehenden Morgenröthe, have been proven wrong.

Those claims, as well as the recurrent esoteric topics in Bulwer-Lytton's works, convinced some commentators that the fictionalised Vril was based on a real magical force. Helena Blavatsky, the founder of Theosophy, endorsed this view in her book Isis Unveiled (1877) and again in The Secret Doctrine (1888). In Blavatsky, the Vril power and its attainment by a superhuman elite are worked into a mystical doctrine of race. However, the character of the subterranean people was transformed. Instead of potential conquerors, they were benevolent (if mysterious) spiritual guides. Blavatsky's recurrent homage to Bulwer-Lytton and the Vril force has exerted a lasting influence on other esoteric authors.

His books are still published by the Theosophical Society. Scott-Elliot's description of Atlantean aircraft has been identified as an early inspiration for authors who have related the Vril force to UFOs after World War II.

George Bernard Shaw read the book and was attracted to the idea of Vril, according to Michael Holroyd's biography of him.

French writer Jules Lermina included a Vril-powered flying machine in his 1910 novel L'Effrayante Aventure (Panic in Paris).

In his 2011 book of correspondences with David Woodard, Swiss writer Christian Kracht discusses his longstanding interest in Vril. David Bowie's 1971 song "Oh! You Pretty Things" makes reference to the novel.

Stage adaptation

A stage adaptation of the book was written by journalist David Christie Murray and magician Nevil Maskelyne. The production premiered at Saint George's Hall in London on 2 January 1905. Both Nevil Maskelyne and his father John Nevil Maskelyne collaborated on the special effects for the play. The play did not meet with success and closed after a run of eight weeks.

Vril Society

Willy Ley

Willy Ley was a German rocket engineer who had immigrated to the United States in 1937. In 1947, he published an article titled "Pseudoscience in Naziland" in the magazine Astounding Science Fiction. He wrote that the high popularity of irrational convictions in Germany at that time explained how Nazism could have fallen on such fertile ground. Among various pseudoscientific groups he mentions one that looked for the Vril: 
"The next group was literally founded upon a novel. That group which I think called itself 'Wahrheitsgesellschaft' – Society for Truth – and which was more or less localised in Berlin, devoted its spare time looking for Vril."

Jacques Bergier and Louis Pauwels
The existence of a Vril Society was alleged in 1960 by Jacques Bergier and Louis Pauwels. In their book The Morning of the Magicians, they claimed that the Vril-Society was a secret community of occultists in pre-Nazi Berlin that was a sort of inner circle of the Thule Society. They also thought that it was in close contact with the English group known as the Hermetic Order of the Golden Dawn. The Vril information takes up about a tenth of the volume, the remainder of which details other esoteric speculations, but the authors fail to clearly explain whether this section is fact or fiction. Historians have shown that there has been no actual historical foundation for the claims of Pauwels and Bergier, and that the article of Willy Ley has only been a vague inspiration for their own ideas. Nevertheless, Pauwels and Bergier have influenced a whole new literary genre dealing with the alleged occult influences on Nazis which have often been related to the fictional Vril Society.

In his book Monsieur Gurdjieff, Louis Pauwels claimed that a Vril Society had been founded by General Karl Haushofer, a student of Russian magician and metaphysician Georges Gurdjieff.

Publications on the Vril Society in German
The book of Jacques Bergier and Louis Pauwels was published in German with the title: Aufbruch ins dritte Jahrtausend: von der Zukunft der phantastischen Vernunft (literally Departure into the Third Millennium: The Future of the Fantastic Reason) in 1969.

In his book Black Sun, Professor Nicholas Goodrick-Clarke refers to the research of the German author Peter Bahn. Bahn writes in his 1996 essay, "Das Geheimnis der Vril-Energie" ("The Secret of Vril Energy"), of his discovery of an obscure esoteric group calling itself the "Reichsarbeitsgemeinschaft", which revealed itself in a rare 1930 publication Vril. Die Kosmische Urkraft (Vril, the cosmic elementary power) written by a member of this Berlin-based group, under the pseudonym "Johannes Täufer" (German: "John [the] Baptist"). Published by the influential astrological publisher, Otto Wilhelm Barth (whom Bahn believes was "Täufer"), the 60-page pamphlet says little of the group other than that it was founded in 1925 to study the uses of Vril energy. The German historian Julian Strube has argued that the historical existence of the "Reichsarbeitsgemeinschaft" can be regarded as irrelevant to the post-war invention of the Vril Society, as Pauwels and Bergier have developed their ideas without any knowledge of that actual association. Strube has also shown that the Vril force has been irrelevant to the other members of the "Reichsarbeitsgemeinschaft," who were supporters of the theories of the Austrian inventor Karl Schappeller (1875–1947).

Esoteric neo-Nazism

After World War II, a group referred to by Nicholas Goodrick-Clarke as the Vienna Circle elaborated an esoteric neo-Nazism that contributed to the circulation of the Vril theme in a new context. In their writings, Vril is associated with Nazi UFOs and the Black Sun concept. Julian Strube wrote that a younger generation related to the Tempelhofgesellschaft, has continued the work of the Vienna Circle and exerts a continuous influence on the most common notions of Vril. Those notions are not only popular in neo-Nazi circles but also in movies or computer games, such as Iron Sky, Wolfenstein, and Call of Duty.

See also

 Aether (classical element)
 Aether theories
Agartha, a legendary kingdom that is said to be located in the Earth's core popular with 19th- and 20th-century occultists theosophists.
 Animal magnetism
 Bovril (aliment)
 Energy (esotericism)
 Etheric body (spirituality)
 Etheric plane (spirituality)
 Jules Verne
 Kerry Bolton, author of The Nexus
"The Mound" by H. P. Lovecraft from a short description by Zealia Bishop— underground civilization fiction apparently clearly inspired by Lytton set in the southwestern U.S.; part of the Cthulhu Mythos
 Mysticism
 Nazism and occultism
 Nazi UFOs
 Odic fluid
The Phantom Empire— film serial with a similar theme that was perhaps inspired by Lytton and in turn an inspiration on Richard Sharpe Shaver's work
 Prana
 Qi
 Richard Shaver — claimed to know of a civilization such as that depicted in Vril
 Stanislav Szukalski developed strange theories about Earth being ruled by a race called the Sons of Yeti.
 Thule
 Unidentified flying object
 Us (2019 film) directed by Jordan Peele depicts a race of subterranean machine-like humans designed to copy their counterparts on the surface.
 Wilhelm Reich's Orgone energy
 Southern Television broadcast interruption (Vrillon television hoax)

References
Notes

Bibliography
 

 

Further reading

External links

  – transcript of unidentified edition that was published as "by Edward Bulwer, Lord Lytton"
  – transcript of another unidentified edition

 
 .
 .
 .
 .

1871 British novels
Novels by Edward Bulwer-Lytton
1871 science fiction novels
British science fiction novels
Social science fiction
1871 fantasy novels
British fantasy novels
Occultism in Nazism
Fictional species and races
Novels about extraterrestrial life
Books about conspiracy theories
Pseudoscience
Dystopian novels
Lost world novels
Utopian novels
Fictional secret societies
Works published anonymously
British novels adapted into plays
Gender role reversal